Mitch Walker may refer to:

 Mitchell L. Walker, an American activist and psychologist.
 Mitch Walker (footballer), an English professional footballer.